Mystery Broadcast is a 1943 American mystery film directed by George Sherman and written by Dane Lussier and Gertrude Walker. The film stars Frank Albertson, Ruth Terry, Nils Asther, Wynne Gibson, Paul Harvey, and Mary Treen. The film was released on November 23, 1943, by Republic Pictures.

Plot

An old murder case intrigues a couple radio detectives and a sound man.  They interview some of the people involved in the case, but soon find their primary suspect dead.  They attempt to solve the mystery.

Cast  
Frank Albertson as Michael Jerome
Ruth Terry as Jan Cornell
Nils Asther as Ricky Moreno
Wynne Gibson as Eve Stanley
Paul Harvey as Arthur J. Stanley
Mary Treen as Smitty
Addison Richards as Bill Burton
Joseph Crehan as Chief Daniels
Alice Fleming as Mida Kent
Francis Pierlot as Crunch
Ken Carpenter as Radio Announcer
Emmett Vogan as Don Fletcher

References

External links

 

1943 films
1940s English-language films
American mystery films
1943 mystery films
Republic Pictures films
Films directed by George Sherman
American black-and-white films
1940s American films